Restitution in moral theology and soteriology signifies an act of commutative justice by which exact reparation as far as possible is made for an injury that has been done to another. In the teaching of certain Christian denominations, restitution is an essential part in salvation.

Methodism 
In Methodism, the way of salvation includes conviction, repentance, restitution, faith, justification, regeneration and adoption, which is followed by sanctification. Restitution is delineated in Methodist catechisms, such as the following:

Restitution occurs subsequent to repentance and is seen as the "essential preparation for saving faith".

Reformed 
In the Reformed view, "restitution is important because it shows how repentance and conversion always produce tangible results." The example of Zacchaeus in the Bible demonstrates "that becoming a disciple of Christ meant restoring to others what has been taken". Restitution occurs subsequent to repentance.

See also
 Atonement in Christianity
 Indemnity
 Reparation (disambiguation)
 Restitution
 Restoration
 Restorative justice

References

Catholic theology and doctrine
Methodism
Atonement